Georges Verriest (15 July 1909 –  11 July 1985) was a French footballer. He played for RC Roubaix, and earned 14 caps for the France national football team, and scored a goal in the 1934 FIFA World Cup.

External links
 

1909 births
1985 deaths
French footballers
France international footballers
1934 FIFA World Cup players
RC Roubaix players
Association football midfielders